The Smith House is a historic house on Memphis Street in Wheatley, Arkansas.  It is a -story wood-frame structure, designed by Charles L. Thompson and built in 1919.  It is the most architecturally significant building in the small community, exhibiting Craftsman style elements including exposed rafters, large brackets supporting extended eaves, and half-timbering on its gable ends.  The rural setting, on a farm, is also unusual for Thompson's work, which is usually found in residential areas.

The house was listed on the National Register of Historic Places in 1982.

See also
National Register of Historic Places listings in St. Francis County, Arkansas

References

Houses on the National Register of Historic Places in Arkansas
Houses completed in 1919
Houses in St. Francis County, Arkansas
National Register of Historic Places in St. Francis County, Arkansas
1919 establishments in Arkansas
American Craftsman architecture in Arkansas
Bungalow architecture in Arkansas